Mary Villiers, Lady Herbert of Shurland is a  oil painting on canvas by Anthony van Dyck. It is a portrait of Mary Stewart, Duchess of Richmond as a young widow (pointing to her mourning brooch), before she married for the second time to the Duke of Richmond.

References

1636 paintings
Portraits by Anthony van Dyck
Paintings in the collection of the Timken Museum of Art
Portraits of women